Riddle of the Sphinx: An Egyptian Adventure is a 2000 graphic adventure game developed by Old World Studios and published by DreamCatcher Interactive. It received a sequel, entitled The Omega Stone: Riddle of the Sphinx II, in 2003. A remastered version, Riddle of the Sphinx: Awakening, was released in 2021.

Gameplay and plot
The gameplay is similar to any game in the post-Myst style, where players navigate through 360 panoramic screens and manipulate items to advance.

The game's plot is about a young archaeologist in Egypt who searches for his or her missing mentor, Sir Gil Blythe Geoffreys.

Development

The game took five years to make. The designers, Jeff & Karen Tobler, were enamored by the beauty and intricacy with which the Egyptians built their architecture, as well as the mysteries and secrets they held. The developers aimed to make the 3D models and renderings in the game as accurate as possible, for instance recreating the Sphinx and Sphinx Enclosure in exact detail. The team asked an expert to provide an authentic translation and editing of a scroll using the style and grammar used by the royal scribes during Chephren's reign They did extensive research into the history and culture of Egypt, and uploaded a lot of their research onto their website.

On the website, the team sold authentic Egyptian merchandise in association with A&E's Merchant Affiliation Program. Riddle of the Sphinx was modeled and rendered almost exclusively with Strata StudioPro, while CyberMesh exports were used for certain occasions. The game contains full-Screen, Interactive 360° Panoramas (QTVR). The game soundtrack was composed and performed entirely by Jeff Tobler.

The game was formally announced on June 10, 1998. In December 1999 it was announced the game would have a Spring 2000 release.

Reception

Critical reviews

The game received above-average reviews according to the review aggregation website Metacritic. IGN said, "Is this an oasis of adventure gaming in a barren desert of crap titles? Nah ... it's just a mirage."

Sales
Market research firm PC Data estimated North American retail sales of 4,955 units for the game during 2000, all of which derived from December. The firm reported another 99,429 retail sales of the game in North America during 2001, and 36,634 during the first six months of 2002. PC Data placed its total North American retail sales for 2003 at 16,747 units; during the first two months of 2004, its jewel case SKU sold 777 units and its original box SKU sold 1,537 units in the region.

Awards
The website won numerous awards, and the game's soundtrack was highly praised.

Legacy
The Omega Stone: Riddle of the Sphinx II was released in 2003.

Riddle of the Sphinx, the second edition, has been continually available on Big Fish Games since 2004 as a download.

In 2015, a Kickstarter campaign was set up to have a 15th anniversary real-time 3D edition of the game, but the campaign was suspended early. 

In 2017, The Old World Studios team, consisting of the original developers and new team members, successfully funded a second Kickstarter campaign. The goal was to release a remastered HD version on desktop and now mobile devices. The release was scheduled for December 2020. The game, titled Riddle of the Sphinx: Awakening, was eventually released on February 1, 2021. Adventure Gamers gave the remaster 4 out 5 stars in their review.

See also
Atlantis II
The Crystal Key
Traitors Gate

References

External links
 Riddle of the Sphinx on the official Old World Studios website
 
 Adventure Gamers interview
 The Edge interview
 Just Adventure interview for sequel
 Reviews

2000 video games
Adventure games
The Adventure Company games
Riddle of the Sphinx
Embracer Group franchises
Kickstarter-funded video games
Classic Mac OS games
MacOS games
Video games developed in the United States
Video games set in Egypt
Windows games